Elíseo Arango Ramos (16 April 1900 – 17 December 1977) was a Colombian lawyer and diplomat who served as the fourth Permanent Representative of Colombia to the United Nations and as Minister of Foreign Affairs. A Conservative Party ideologue and politician, he was part of the far-right group known as "Los Leopardos" (The Leopards).

References

Further reading
 

1900 births
1977 deaths
People from Chocó Department
Permanent Representatives of Colombia to the United Nations
Foreign ministers of Colombia
Colombian Conservative Party politicians
Members of the Chamber of Representatives of Colombia